Psychotechnique forms part of the 'system' of actor training, preparation, and rehearsal developed by the Russian theatre practitioner Konstantin Stanislavski. It describes the inner, psychological elements of training that support what he called "experiencing" a role in performance. In a rehearsal process, psychotechnique is interrelated with the "embodiment" of the role, in order to achieve a fully realised characterisation. Stanislavski describes the elements of psychotechnique in the first part of his manual An Actor's Work.

References

 Carnicke, Sharon M. 1998. Stanislavsky in Focus. Russian Theatre Archive Ser. London: Harwood Academic Publishers. .
 Carnicke, Sharon M. 2000. "Stanislavsky's System: Pathways for the Actor". In Hodge (2000, 11–36).
 Hodge, Alison, ed. 2000. Twentieth-Century Actor Training. London and New York: Routledge. .
 Stanislavski, Konstantin. 1938. An Actor's Work: A Student's Diary. Trans. and ed. Jean Benedetti. London and New York: Routledge, 2008. .

Acting techniques